Heinrich Gottlieb Tzschirner (14 November 1778 – 17 February 1828) was a German Protestant theologian born in Mittweida, Saxony.

He studied theology at the University of Leipzig, receiving his habilitation in 1800 with assistance from Dresden examinator Franz Volkmar Reinhard (1753-1812). For a period of time he worked as a private lecturer at the University of Wittenberg, and following his father's death became deacon in his home town of Mittweida. In 1805 he was appointed professor of theology at Wittenberg, later returning to Leipzig (1809), where in 1811 he became rector of the university.

In 1813 he joined the Saxon Army as a chaplain during the Napoleonic Wars. He returned to Leipzig the following year, subsequently becoming archdeacon of St. Thomas Church and superintendent of the Diocese of Leipzig.

As a theologian, Tzschirner was an advocate of ethical and critical rationalism, believing that common sense morality was the supreme principle of Christianity. In one of his better known works, Protestantismus and Katholicismus aus dem Standpunkte der Politik betrachlet, he staunchly defended the Protestant cause versus Catholicism. In addition to his own written works, he continued publication of Johann Matthias Schröckh's Christliche Kirchengeschichte seit der Reformation (Church History since the Reformation) after Schröckh's death in 1808.

Selected publications
 Geschichte der Apologetik (History of apologetics), 1805
 Ueber die Verwandtschaft der Tugenden und der Laster (Relationship of virtues and vices), 1809
 Predigten (Collection of sermons), 1812
 Ueber Johann Matthias Schröckh's Leben, Charakter und Schriften (Johann Matthias Schröckh's life, character and writings), 1812
 Ueber den Krieg, ein philosophischer Versuch  (About the war, a philosophical approach), 1815
 Die Ehe aus dem Gesichtspunkte der Natur, der Moral und der Kirche (Marriage of the elements of nature, morality and the church), 1819
 Protestantismus und Katholicismus aus dem Standpuncte der Politik (Protestantism and Catholicism from a political standpoint), 1822
 Die Gefahr einer Deutschen Revolution (The Danger of a German revolution), 1823
 Der Fall des Heidenthums (The fall of heathenism), 1829

References
 Schaff Encyclopedia (biography)
 Parts of this article are based on a translation of an article from the German Wikipedia.

1778 births
1828 deaths
People from Mittweida
People from the Electorate of Saxony
German Lutheran theologians
19th-century German Protestant theologians
German male non-fiction writers
Leipzig University alumni
Academic staff of Leipzig University
Rectors of Leipzig University
German military chaplains
Napoleonic Wars chaplains
Academic staff of the University of Wittenberg